The Inkosi Langalibalele Local Municipality council consists of forty-seven members elected by mixed-member proportional representation. Twenty-four councillors were elected by first-past-the-post voting in twenty-four wards, while the remaining twenty-three were chosen from party lists so that the total number of party representatives was proportional to the number of votes received

It was established for the 2016 South African municipal elections by the merging of Imbabazane and uMtshezi local municipalities.

In the election of 1 November 2021, the Inkatha Freedom Party (IFP) won a plurality of twenty-one seats on the council.

Results 
The following table shows the composition of the council after past elections.

August 2016 election

The following table shows the results of the 2016 election.

November 2021 election

The following table shows the results of the 2021 election.

References

Inkosi Langalibalele
Elections in KwaZulu-Natal
Uthukela District Municipality